Nicholas of Tolentino ((c. 1246September 10, 1305), known as the Patron of Holy Souls, was an Italian saint and mystic. He is particularly invoked as an advocate for the souls in Purgatory, especially during Lent and the month of November. In many Augustinian churches, there are weekly devotions to St. Nicholas on behalf of the suffering souls. November 2, All Souls' Day, holds special significance for the devotees of St. Nicholas of Tolentino.

Life
Born in 1245 in Sant'Angelo in Pontano, St. Nicholas of Tolentino took his name from St. Nicholas of Myra, at whose shrine his parents prayed to have a child. Nicholas became a friar at 18, and seven years later, he was ordained a priest. He gained a reputation as a preacher and a confessor. C. 1274, he was sent to Tolentino, near his birthplace. The town suffered from civil strife between the Guelphs and Ghibellines, in their struggle for control of Italy. Nicholas was primarily a pastor to his flock. He ministered to the poor and criminals. He is said to have cured the sick with bread over which he had prayed to Mary, the Mother of God. He gained a reputation as a wonderworker. Nicholas died in 1305 after a long illness. People began immediately to petition for his canonization. Eugene IV canonized him in 1446, and his relics were rediscovered in 1926 at Tolentino.

A studious, kind and gentle youth, at the age of 16 Nicholas became an Augustinian novice and was a student of the Blessed Angelus de Scarpetti.  A friar at the monasteries at Recanati and Macerata as well as others, he was ordained in 1270 at the age of 25, and soon became known for his preaching and teachings.  Nicholas, who had had visions of angels reciting "to Tolentino", in 1274 took this as a sign to move to that city, where he lived the rest of his life. Nicholas worked to counteract the decline of morality and religion which came with the development of city life in the late thirteenth century.

On account of his kind and gentle manner his superiors entrusted him with the daily feeding of the poor at the monastery gates, but at times he was so free with the friary's provisions that the procurator begged the superior to check his generosity. Once, when weak after a long fast, he received a vision of the Blessed Virgin Mary and Saint Augustine, who told him to eat some bread marked with a cross and dipped in water. Upon doing so he was immediately stronger. He started distributing these rolls to the ailing, while praying to Mary, often curing the sufferers; this is the origin of the Augustinian custom of blessing and distributing Saint Nicholas Bread.

In Tolentino, Nicholas worked as a peacemaker in a city torn by strife between the Guelphs and Ghibellines who, in the conflict for control of Italy, supported the Pope and the Holy Roman Emperor respectively. He ministered to his flock, helped the poor and visited prisoners. When working wonders or healing people, he always asked those he helped to "Say nothing of this", explaining that he was just God's instrument.

During his life, Nicholas is said to have received visions, including images of Purgatory, which friends ascribed to his lengthy fasts. Prayer for the souls in Purgatory was the outstanding characteristic of his spirituality. Because of this Nicholas was proclaimed patron of the souls in Purgatory, in 1884 by Leo XIII.

Towards the end of his life he became ill, suffering greatly, but still continued the mortifications that had been part of his holy life. Nicholas died on September 10, 1305.

Legends

There are many tales and legends which relate to Nicholas. One says the devil once beat him with a stick, which was then displayed for years in his church. In another, Nicholas, a vegetarian, was served a roasted fowl, for which he made the sign of the cross, and it flew out a window. Nine passengers on a ship going down at sea once asked Nicholas' aid, and he appeared in the sky, wearing the black Augustinian habit, radiating golden light, holding a lily in his left hand, and with his right hand, he quelled the storm. An apparition of the saint, it is said, once saved the burning palace of the Doge of Venice by throwing a piece of blessed bread on the flames.  He was also reported to have resurrected over one hundred dead children, including several who had drowned together.

According to the Peruvian chronicler Antonio de la Calancha, it was St. Nicholas of Tolentino who made possible a permanent Spanish settlement in the rigorous, high-altitude climate of Potosí, Bolivia. He reported that all children born to Spanish colonists there died in childbirth or soon thereafter, until a father dedicated his unborn child to St. Nicholas of Tolentino (whose own parents, after all, had required saintly intervention to have a child). The colonist's son, born on Christmas Eve, 1598, survived to healthy adulthood, and many later parents followed the example of naming their sons Nicolás.

Veneration

Nicholas was canonized by Pope Eugene IV (also an Augustinian) on June 5, 1446. He was the first Augustinian to be canonized. At his canonization, Nicholas was credited with three hundred miracles, including three resurrections.

The remains of St. Nicholas are preserved at the Shrine of Saint Nicholas in the Basilica di San Nicola da Tolentino in the city of Tolentino, province of Macerata in Marche, Italy.

He is particularly invoked as an advocate for the souls in Purgatory, especially during Lent and the month of November. In many Augustinian churches, there are weekly devotions to St. Nicholas on behalf of the suffering souls. November 2, All Souls' Day, holds special significance for the devotees of St. Nicholas of Tolentino.

St Pius V did not include him in the Tridentine Calendar, but he was later inserted and given September 10 as his feast day. Judged to be of limited importance worldwide, his liturgical celebration was not kept in the 1969 revision of the General Roman Calendar, but he is still recognized as one of the saints of the Roman Catholic Church.

A number of churches and oratories are dedicated to him, including San Nicolò da Tolentino in Venice, San Nicola da Tolentino agli Orti Sallustiani in Rome, St. Nicholas of Tolentino in The Bronx, New York City, and St. Nicholas of Tolentino in Bristol, UK.

In Ireland, Augustinian churches and friaries historically marked his feast day with a ceremony distributing bread, sometimes with his likeness on the loaves. This practice was most strongly related to churches in County Waterford.

Philippines
In the Philippines, the 16th century Church of San Nicolas de Tolentino in Banton, Romblon, was built in honor of him and his feast day is celebrated as the annual Biniray festival, commemorating the devotion of the island's Catholic inhabitants to St. Nicholas during the Muslim raids in the 16th century.

In the province of Pampanga, a 440-year-old Augustinian church, which was founded in 1575, built in his honor is located in the heart of Macabebe, Pampanga. The façade of the church has scantly ornamentation and its architectural symmetry is lost amid and the various forms assumed the windows and the main entrance. Simple neo-classic lines of the façade. Presently, a second class relic of the saint is venerated every Tuesdays after the mass.

In the province of Nueva Ecija, St. Nicholas is being venerated as the titular of the historic Cabanatuan Cathedral where General Antonio Luna was assassinated in 1899. His first class relic is being exposed to the faithful from September 1 until September 10 every year.

In Dimiao, Bohol, the feast of San Nicolas de Tolentino, patron saint of the parish church built between 1797 and 1815, is also celebrated every  September 10.

There is also the San Nicolas de Tolentino Parish Church along C. Padilla Street in Cebu City, the capital city of the province and island of Cebu. Built in 1584, the church is one of the oldest in the country. The church was also built years ahead of the establishment of the Cebu Diocese in 1595. Located some 1.5 kilometer south of the ciudad, it was called Cebu Viejo, separated from the ciudad by the Pagina creek and El Pardo. The area is also considered the original site of the landing of Miguel López de Legazpi's armada on April 17, 1565 and became the embryo of a settlement which Legaspi established. San Nicolas was a vibrant town during the Spanish Period, the spawning ground for the Revolution against Spain in 1898, and the birthplace of Cebuano musical legends of the 20th century. The town eventually merged with Cebu City on April 17, 1901.

The 16th century church in Sinait, Ilocos Sur is dedicated to Saint Nicholas of Tolentino. In May 2021, Pope Francis elevated the parish church to the status of minor basilica.

Iconography

He is depicted in the black habit of the Order of the Hermits of St. Augustine — a star above him or on his breast, a lily, or a crucifix garlanded with lilies, in his hand. Sometimes, instead of the lily, he holds a vial filled with money or bread.

See also
 Saint Nicholas of Tolentino, patron saint archive

References

External links
Catholic Online Saints: Nicholas of Tolentino
Lives of the Saints, September 10: Saint Nicholas of Tolentino
 St. Nicholas of Tolentine - Midwest Augustinians

1246 births
1305 deaths
People from the Province of Macerata
Italian Roman Catholic saints
Augustinian friars
Augustinian saints
Augustinian mystics
14th-century Christian mystics
14th-century Christian saints
Incorrupt saints
Marian visionaries
Angelic visionaries